Vitalie Cercheș (born 9 May 1973) is a former Moldovan middle distance runner, born in Chișinău. He competed for his country at the 2000 Summer Olympics in Sydney, Australia, where he competed in the 800 metres finishing seventh in his heat and therefore not progressing to the next round.

External links
Sports-reference.com

1973 births
Living people
Sportspeople from Chișinău
Moldovan male middle-distance runners
Athletes (track and field) at the 2000 Summer Olympics
Olympic athletes of Moldova